Oltenița  is a city in Călărași County, Muntenia, Romania, on the left bank of the river Argeș, where its waters flow into the Danube.

Geography
The city is located in the southwestern part of the county; it stands across the Danube from the Bulgarian city of Tutrakan. 

The national road DN4 connects Oltenița to Bucharest,  to the northwest. Road  connects it to the county seat, Călărași,  to the east, and road  connects it to Giurgiu,  to the west.

The Oltenița train station, located near the intersection of those three roads, serves the CFR Line 801, which connects the city to Bucharest (Titan Sud and Obor stations).

History
Excavations on Gumelnița hill near the city revealed a Neolithic settlement dating from the 4th millennium BC.

The first mention of a town bearing the name Oltenița appears in 1515 during the reign of Neagoe Basarab.

In November 1853, at the start of the Crimean War the Ottoman forces attempted to cross the river at this point and inflicted heavy losses on the Russian forces at the Battle of Oltenița.

During the Russo-Turkish War, 1877–1878, Oltenița was an important crossing point into Bulgaria for Romanian troops called to aid the Russian Army during the siege of the Pleven (Plevna) stronghold.

During World War I at Turtucaia, across the Danube from Oltenița, Battle of Turtucaia ended in a significant defeat for the Romanian Army and subsequently the garrisons of Oltenița and Turtucaia engaged in numerous artillery skirmishes.

Education
There are three high schools in Oltenița: Neagoe Basarab High School, Ion Ghica Technologic High School, and Nicolae Bălcescu Technologic High School.

Sports
Stadionul Municipal is the home ground of the football club CSM Oltenița and holds 2,500 people.

Gallery

Notable residents
 Peter A. Abeles (1886–1952), Jewish Romanian-American lawyer, politician, and judge
 Ion Iliescu (born 1930), 2nd President of Romania (1989–96 and 2000–04)
 Alice Săvulescu (1905–1970), scientist, titular member of the Romanian Academy
 Ion Petre Stoican (1930–1994), violinist, a lăutar

References

Populated places in Călărași County
Localities in Muntenia
Populated places on the Danube
Port cities and towns in Romania
Crimean War
Cities in Romania
Bulgaria–Romania border crossings